Central Aran Economic Region is one of the 14 economic regions of Azerbaijan. It borders the economic regions of Shaki-Zagatala, Mountainous Shirvan, Shirvan-Salyan, Mil-Mughan, Karabakh, and Ganja-Dashkasan. The region consists of the districts of Agdash, Goychay, Kurdamir, Ujar, Yevlakh, Zardab, as well as the city of Mingachevir. Its population was estimated to be at 740 thousand people in January 2021.

History 
Central Aran Economic Region was established on 7 July 2021 as part of a reform of the economic region system of Azerbaijan. Its territory was part of the larger Aran Economic Region prior to 2021.

References 

Economic regions of Azerbaijan